Pyotr Stepanovich Kotlyarevsky (23 June 1782 – 2 November  1852) was a Russian military hero of the early 19th century.

Biography

He was born in the village of Olkhovatka near Kharkiv into a cleric's family. Kotlyarevsky was brought up in an infantry regiment quartered near Mozdok. He was promoted officer for his exploits during Count Zubov's Persian Campaign in 1796.

His  leadership and boldness made him a national celebrity during the Russo-Turkish War (1806–12)#Caucasus Front and the Russo-Persian War (1804-1813). In 1810 he took hold of Meghri Citadel, withstood a siege by the Persian army and then routed them on the Araks River. In 1812, he defeated Abbas Mirza in the Battle of Aslanduz and stormed Lankaran with as little as around 2,500 soldiers. Thereupon the Persians sued for peace, and Kotlyarevsky was promoted General of Infantry (a rank equal to that of Full General in other armies). Suffering from wounds, he had to retire from active service and spent the rest of his life in Feodosiya, where he eventually died as well.

A local artist, Ivan Aivazovsky, devised Kotlyarevsky's mausoleum, while Prince Vorontsov ordered his statue to be erected in Ganja.

External links
Biography 

1782 births
1852 deaths
People from Voronezh Oblast
Russian generals
People of the Russo-Persian Wars
Recipients of the Order of St. George of the Second Degree
Recipients of the Order of St. George of the Third Degree